IEEE 802.3 is a working group and a collection standards defining the physical layer and data link layer's media access control (MAC) of wired Ethernet. The standards are produced by the working group of Institute of Electrical and Electronics Engineers (IEEE). This is generally a local area network (LAN) technology with some wide area network (WAN) applications. Physical connections are made between nodes and/or infrastructure devices (hubs, switches, routers) by various types of copper or fiber cable.

802.3 is a technology that supports the IEEE 802.1 network architecture.

802.3 also defines LAN access method using CSMA/CD.

Communication standards

See also
 IEEE 802
 IEEE 802.11, a set of wireless networking standards
 IEEE 802.16, a set of WiMAX standards
 IEEE Standards Association

References

External links
 The IEEE 802.3 Working Group
 Get IEEE 802.3 LAN/MAN CSMA/CD Access Method—Download 802.3 specifications.

IEEE 802.03
Media access control
Physical layer protocols
Working groups
Ethernet standards